Quartzsite is a town in La Paz County, Arizona, United States. According to the 2020 census, the population was 2,413.

Interstate 10 runs directly through Quartzsite which is at the intersection of U.S. Route 95 and Arizona State Route 95 with I-10.

History
Where Quartzsite is now located, was from 1863 to the 1880s the site of a waterhole and later a stage station, called Tyson's Wells, along the La Paz - Wikenburg Road on Tyson Wash, in what was then Yuma County, in the newly created Arizona Territory. It was about 20 miles from the Colorado River steamboat landing of La Paz and 25 miles from the landing of Erhenburg from 1866.  The next stop was 25 miles to the east at Desert Station. 

Tyson's Wells in 1875 was described by Martha Summerhayes, in her book Vanished Arizona:

In the valley around Tyson's Wells were places known to have been successfully worked by individual prospectors since the beginning of the Colorado River Gold Rush of the 1860s up until the 1950s.  Some large scale operations in the early 20th century were failures.

Geography and climate

Quartzsite lies on the western portion of the La Posa Plain along Tyson Wash. The Dome Rock Mountains overlook the town on the west with Granite Mountain on the southwest edge of the town and Oldman Mountain on the northwest. The Plomosa Mountains lie across the La Posa Plain to the east.

The town has a hot desert climate (Köppen BWh) with mild to warm winters from November to March and hot to extreme summers for the remainder of the year.

There is very little precipitation with only  falling during an average year, while in May and June more than 80 percent of years do not have measurable rainfall. This moisture was due to the remnants of a rare Gulf of California hurricane. However, between July 2001 and August 2002 as little as  fell over thirteen months.

Demographics

As of the census of 2000, there were 3,354 people, 1,850 households, and 1,176 families residing in the town. The racial makeup of the town was 94.5% White, 0.2% Black or African American, 1.2% Native American, 0.3% Asian, 0.1% Pacific Islander, 2.6% from other races, and 1.2% from two or more races.  5.0% of the population were Hispanic or Latino of any race.

There were 1,850 households, out of which 5.0% had children under the age of 18 living with them, 59.0% were married couples living together, 2.9% had a female householder with no husband present, and 36.4% were non-families. 31.5% of all households were made up of individuals, and 19.1% had someone living alone who was 65 years of age or older.  The average household size was 1.81 and the average family size was 2.18.

In the town, the population was spread out, with 5.7% under the age of 18, 1.8% from 18 to 24, 7.7% from 25 to 44, 29.9% from 45 to 64, and 54.9% who were 65 years of age or older.  The median age was 66 years. For every 100 females, there were 102.8 males.  For every 100 females age 18 and over, there were 101.9 males.

The median income for a household in the town was $23,053, and the median income for a family was $26,382. Males had a median income of $20,313 versus $16,080 for females. The per capita income for the town was $15,889.  About 7.8% of families and 13.5% of the population were below the poverty line, including 20.3% of those under age 18 and 10.0% of those age 65 or over.

Tourism

Quartzsite is a popular recreational vehicle camping area for winter visitors with tourism being the major contributor to Quartzsite's economy. The Rubber Tramp Rendezvous, an annual gathering of vandwellers, takes place in January. Nine major gem and mineral shows, and 15 general swap meet shows are very popular tourist attractions, attracting about 1.5 million people annually, mostly during January and February.

Quartzsite is the burial place of Hi Jolly (Hadji Ali), an Ottoman citizen of Greek-Syrian parentage, who took part in the experimental US Camel Corps as a camel driver. The Hi Jolly Monument was added to the National Register of Historic Places in 2011.

Quartzsite is also the site of Joanne's Gum Museum, which is open to the public and features a large collection of gum wrappers from around the world.

The Arizona Peace Trail goes through Quartzsite.

Transportation
The Town of Quartzsite operates demand response buses under the name Camel Express that provide weekday service to Quartzsite and La Paz Valley, weekly service to Parker, twice monthly service to Yuma and Blythe, and monthly service to Lake Havasu City. Greyhound Lines serves Quartzsite on its route from Los Angeles to Dallas.
Freeways and state highways in Quartzsite include:
  Interstate 10
  State Route 95

Gallery

The following gallery includes the images of:
 Ruins of Fort Tyson, which was built in 1856 and is located on the corner of Main St. and Moon Mountain Road.
 Tyson's Well Stage Station, built in 1866 and located in 161 West Main Street. The stage station served the travelers who went back and forth from the towns of Ehrenberg and Wickenburg. The building now houses the Quartzsite Museum and Historical Society. 
 The restored Oasis Hotel, which was originally built in 1900 and located in Main Street.
 The grave of Hadji Ali (1828–1902), a.k.a. Hi Jolly. The grave, located in the Hi Jolly Cemetery, was listed in the National Register of Historic Places on February 28, 2011, reference #11000054.

In popular culture
One of the primary locations in the 1988 computer role-playing game Wasteland is the town of  Quartz. Wasteland Scenario Designer Ken St. Andre, a lifelong resident of Phoenix, Arizona, confirmed that Quartz is fictionalized version of the real town of "Quartzite".

Quartzsite is featured in the Oscar-winning movie Nomadland.

William Hogan's 1981 coming-of-age novel The Quartzsite Trip is set largely in the town of Quartzsite.

"At the Hop" singer Danny Rapp committed suicide at a hotel in Quartzsite.

Writer Anaïs Nin entered into a bigamist marriage with actor Rupert Pole in Quartzsite on March 17, 1955. Actor Jack Kelly and actress May Wynn were married in Quartzsite on October 14, 1956.

See also

 Fort Tyson
 List of historic properties in Quartzsite, Arizona

References

External links

 Town website
 Quartzsite Times
 Desert Messenger
 Quartzsite information at Desert USA
 BLM camping information

Towns in La Paz County, Arizona
Populated places in the Sonoran Desert
La Paz–Wikenburg Road
Populated places established in 1989